For Ellington is a tribute album by American jazz group the Modern Jazz Quartet featuring performances of compositions associated with Duke Ellington recorded in 1988 and released on the East West label.

Reception
The Allmusic review stated "This is a tribute album that works quite well... The ballads sometimes get a little sleepy but on a whole this is a very enjoyable release".

Track listing
All compositions by Duke Ellington except as indicated
 "For Ellington" (John Lewis) - 8:01     
 "Jack the Bear" - 5:04     
 "Prelude to a Kiss" (Ellington, Irving Gordon, Irving Mills) - 5:05     
 "It Don't Mean a Thing (If It Ain't Got That Swing)" (Ellington, Mills) - 5:45     
 "Ko Ko" - 5:44     
 "Maestro E.K.E." (Milt Jackson) - 5:37     
 "Sepia Panorama" - 5:32     
 "Rockin' in Rhythm" (Harry Carney, Ellington, Mills) - 6:33     
 "Come Sunday" - 4:11

Personnel
Milt Jackson - vibraphone
John Lewis - piano
Percy Heath - bass
Connie Kay - drums, percussion

References

East West Records albums
Modern Jazz Quartet albums
1988 albums
Albums produced by Nesuhi Ertegun